"A Fork in the Road" is a 1965 Motown song recorded by American R&B singing group The Miracles, and written by Miracles members Smokey Robinson, Pete Moore, and Ronnie White, on Motown Records' Tamla subsidiary label. (T54118)  This song was included as the closing track on  the Miracles' 1965 studio LP, Going to a Go-Go, and was also released as the B-side of their million-selling Grammy Hall of Fame hit single, "The Tracks of My Tears". Though this original version never charted nationally, it was a strong regional hit in many areas of the country and a popular part of the Miracles' live show.  Cash Box described it as a "tradition-oriented emotion-packed moody blueser."

Nineteen years later, American singer Rebbie Jackson recorded the song for her debut album, Centipede. Jackson's version was released as a single, and peaked at number 40 on the R&B chart.

The Miracles' 2002 CD re-release of the Going To A Go Go/Away We A Go Go albums features a never-before released live version of "A Fork in the Road", delivered to an enthusiastic audience response.

Personnel Credits

Personnel: The Miracles

Lead vocals - Smokey Robinson
Background vocals- Claudette Rogers Robinson
Background vocals- Pete Moore
Background vocals- Ronnie White
Background vocals- Bobby Rogers
Guitar- Marv Tarplin

Other Personnel
Other instrumentation by The Funk Brothers

References

External links
 
 

1965 songs
1985 singles
The Miracles songs
Rebbie Jackson songs
Songs written by Smokey Robinson
Songs written by Warren "Pete" Moore
Songs written by Ronald White
Song recordings produced by Smokey Robinson
Tamla Records singles